Leština is a municipality and village in Ústí nad Orlicí District in the Pardubice Region of the Czech Republic. It has about 300 inhabitants.

Administrative parts
Villages of Doubravice, Dvořiště and Podhořany u Nových Hradů are administrative parts of Leština.

References

External links

Villages in Ústí nad Orlicí District